Lødingen is the administrative centre of Lødingen Municipality in Nordland county, Norway.  The village is located on the southwestern shore of the island of Hinnøya.  The village is also located where the southern mouth of the Tjeldsundet strait meets the Vestfjorden.  The Norwegian National Road 85 runs through the village and continues on the Bognes–Lødingen ferry route.

The village is the business and transportation centre for the municipality.  It has the municipal government offices, school, Lødingen Church, as well as a museum.

Etymology
The village (and municipality) is named after the old Lødingen farm (Old Norse: Lǫðueng), since the first Lødingen Church was built there.  The first element is the genitive case of laða which means "grain/hay barn" and the last element is eng which means "meadow".

References

Lødingen
Villages in Nordland
Populated places of Arctic Norway